"Ease on Down the Road" is a song from the 1975 Broadway musical The Wiz, an R&B re-interpretation of L. Frank Baum's The Wonderful Wizard of Oz. The Charlie Smalls–composed tune is the show's version of both "Follow the Yellow Brick Road" and "We're Off to See the Wizard" from the 1939 version of The Wizard of Oz. In the song, performed three times during the show, Dorothy and her friends the Scarecrow, the Tin Man, and the Cowardly Lion dance their way down the Yellow Brick Road and give each other words of encouragement.

Two versions of the song have been released as charting singles: one associated with the Broadway show by studio group Consumer Rapport in 1975, and a second recorded by Diana Ross and Michael Jackson for the feature-film adaptation of The Wiz (1978).

History

Early versions
The earliest version of the song was recorded by the Hues Corporation in 1974, for their second studio album Rockin' Soul. The song was performed by the original Baltimore cast of The Wiz at the Morris A. Mechanic Theatre in October 1974 which included Renee Harris as Dorothy, Charles Valentino as the Scarecrow, Ben Harney as the Tin Man, Ken Prymus as the Cowardly Lion, and Butterfly McQueen as the Queen of the Field Mice. From January 5, 1975, the song was performed by the new Broadway cast at the Majestic Theatre which included Stephanie Mills (Dorothy), Hinton Battle (Scarecrow), Tiger Haynes (Tin Man) and Ted Ross (Cowardly Lion), who also performed the song on the original 1975 cast album for The Wiz. The song was a number-one disco hit for five non-consecutive weeks in a recording by the disco studio group Consumer Rapport. Produced by Stephen Y. Scheaffer and The Wiz musical arranger Harold Wheeler, the Consumer Rapport version hit the Billboard Soul Singles chart, peaking at #19 and the Hot 100, peaking at #42.

Diana Ross and Michael Jackson version
In 1977, "Ease on Down the Road" was recorded as a duet between Diana Ross and Michael Jackson and released as the theme song of the 1978 film adaptation of The Wiz. As with the rest of the music in the film, the film version of "Ease on Down the Road" was produced by Quincy Jones. The recording was one of Jackson's first collaborations with Quincy Jones, who became his main producer during the late 1970s and 1980s.

Released as a single by MCA Records in late summer 1978, the song missed the U.S. top 40 by one position, peaking at #41 on the Billboard Hot 100. It reached #17 on the Billboard Hot Soul Singles chart the same year. AllMusic's William Ruhlmann wrote that duet between Jackson and Ross has "spectacular vocal firepower" and that it outperforms the 1975 version by Consumer Rapport. The recording also earned Jackson his first Grammy Award nomination with Ross (his previous two were with his family group, the Jacksons) in the category of Best R&B Performance by a Duo or Group with Vocal in 1979.

In 1980, Jackson was a guest on Kraft Salutes Disneyland's 25th Anniversary and, along with Disney characters (Mickey Mouse, The Seven Dwarves, Donald Duck, Pinocchio, Minnie Mouse, Chip 'n' Dale, Pluto, Winnie the Pooh, The Three Little Pigs, and Goofy), performed the song in a medley with the Disney signature song "When You Wish Upon a Star".

Charts

Consumer Rapport version

Diana Ross and Michael Jackson version

In popular culture
 Della Reese performed the song in the 1975 episode "Della, Della, Della" of the situation comedy Sanford and Son along with Fred G. Sanford.
 In 1977, the song was performed by the cast of The Brady Bunch Variety Hour in a skit based on Pinocchio.
 In 1979, Kathy Romanko and the Crystal Pryzm covered the song on their album Portraits.
 In 1980, The Muppet Show featured the song, played by guest Jean-Pierre Rampal, during episode 510, in a retelling of Pied Piper of Hamelin.
 Stephen King references the song in the Dark Tower novel The Gunslinger.
 The song appears on Richard Simmons Broadway video Broadway Sweat.
 The song appears in NBC's 2015 production of The Wiz Live!, performed by the TV special's stars Shanice Williams, Elijah Kelley, Ne-Yo and David Alan Grier.
 In 2015, Saturday Night Live cast members Sasheer Zamata, Michael Che, Jay Pharoah and Kenan Thompson sang part of the song, while respectively portraying Dorothy and her friends in a crossover between The Wiz Live! and the movie The Wizard of Oz (1939). At the end of the sketch, they sang it again while teaching the 1939 Scarecrow (played by Ryan Gosling) how to dance the Dab.

References

1974 songs
1975 singles
1978 singles
Hues Corporation songs
Diana Ross songs
Michael Jackson songs
Songs from musicals
Songs written by Charlie Smalls
Atlantic Records singles
MCA Records singles
Male–female vocal duets
Songs about roads